Huang Shi Zhao (born 30 November 1973 in Guangzhou, China), is a Chinese motorcycle racer. He is the 2010 China Superbike Championship 600cc overall champion for Yes! Tianjian Yamaha Racing.

In 2003, he raced for Arlen Ness in the 250cc World Championship race in Sepang, Malaysia. He finished 19th.

He raced in the 250cc World Championship in Shanghai, China in 2006 and finished 20th in the race for Yamaha Tianjina Racing.

Huang also raced in the 2007 250cc World Championship. But he retired in Japan and failed to start in China due to an injury in practice.

In 2010, he raced for Yes! Yamaha Tianjian Racing in the 600cc class of the China Superbike Championship. He won 7 races out of 8 and became the class champion.

By season

Races by year

(key)

References

External links
Huang Shi Zhao profile and records on www.motogp.com
Huang Shi Zhao Profile on Chinese Motorcycle Sport Association official website
Huang Shi-Zhao profile on www.CSBK.com/EN

250cc World Championship riders
1973 births
Living people
Chinese motorcycle racers
Sportspeople from Guangzhou